Goephanomimus is a genus of beetles in the family Cerambycidae, containing the following species:

 Goephanomimus albopunctatulus Breuning, 1957
 Goephanomimus flavopictus Breuning, 1957
 Goephanomimus vagepictus Breuning, 1957

References

Acanthocinini
Taxa named by Stephan von Breuning (entomologist)